The 2020 WNBA season was the 13th season for the Atlanta Dream of the Women's National Basketball Association. The team began its season on July 26, 2020 against the Dallas Wings.

On October 18, 2019, the Dream unveiled a rebrand of their logo and color scheme for their upcoming season. The Dream was originally scheduled to start play its home games at the new Gateway Center Arena at College Park, electing to move from State Farm Arena in the 2019 off-season. The WNBA season was to have a 36-game schedule, which would have been the most games in a season in league history. However, the plan for expanded games was put on hold on April 3, when the WNBA postponed its season due to the COVID-19 pandemic. Under a plan approved on June 15, the league is scheduled to hold a shortened 22-game regular season at IMG Academy, without fans present, starting on July 24.

The Dream started the season promisingly, winning two of their first three games.  That promise was short lived, as the team lost their next ten games in a row.  After the ten game losing streak was broken, the Dream lost their next two games to finish August with a 3–13 record, and a slim hope at making the playoffs.  September proved to be a turn in fortunes for the Dream.  They recorded four wins in five games to go into their final game against the Washington Mystics, with a chance to make the playoffs.  However, Washington prevailed and the Dream missed the playoffs.  Their overall winning percentage of .318 was the third worst in team history.

Transactions

WNBA Draft

The Dream made the following selections in the 2020 WNBA Draft.

Trades and Roster Changes

Roster

Depth

Schedule

Regular Season

|- style="background:#bbffbb;"
| 1
| July 26
| Dallas
| W 105–95
| Billings (30)
| Billings (13)
| Carter (8)
| IMG Academy
| 1–0
|- style="background:#fcc;"
| 2
| July 29
| Las Vegas
| L 70–100
| E. Williams (16)
| Billings (7)
| Tied (4)
| IMG Academy
| 1–1
|- style="background:#bbffbb;"
| 3
| July 31
| New York
| W 84–78
| Laney (30)
| Billings (15)
| Carter (3)
| IMG Academy
| 2–1

|- style="background:#fcc;"
| 4
| August 2
| Indiana
| L 77–93
| C. Williams (18)
| Billings (8)
| Laney (6)
| IMG Academy
| 2–2
|- style="background:#fcc;"
| 5
| August 4
| Phoenix
| L 74–81
| Carter (26)
| C. Williams (9)
| Laney (5)
| IMG Academy
| 2–3
|- style="background:#fcc;"
| 6
| August 6
| Seattle
| L 92–93
| Carter (35)
| C. Williams (10)
| Carter (7)
| IMG Academy
| 2–4
|- style="background:#fcc;"
| 7
| August 8
| Dallas
| L 75–85
| Laney (16)
| Tied (7)
| 3 tied (3)
| IMG Academy
| 2–5
|- style="background:#fcc;"
| 8
| August 10
| Connecticut
| L 82–93
| Stricklen (18)
| C. Williams (7)
| Dietrick (6)
| IMG Academy
| 2–6
|- style="background:#fcc;"
| 9
| August 12
| Seattle
| L 63–100
| Laney (17)
| Tied (7)
| Dietrick (4)
| IMG Academy
| 2–7
|- style="background:#fcc;"
| 10
| August 14
| Phoenix
| L 80–96
| Laney (16)
| C. Williams (14)
| Dietrick (7)
| IMG Academy
| 2–8
|- style="background:#fcc;"
| 11
| August 16
| Chicago
| L 67–92
| C. Williams (15)
| Billings (8)
| Tied (4)
| IMG Academy
| 2–9
|- style="background:#fcc;"
| 12
| August 19
| Washington
| L 91–98
| Laney (35)
| Billings (12)
| C. Williams (7)
| IMG Academy
| 2–10
|- style="background:#fcc;"
| 13
| August 21
| Los Angeles
| L 85–93 (OT)
| Johnson (23)
| Billings (9)
| Laney (11)
| IMG Academy
| 2–11
|- style="background:#bbffbb;"
| 14
| August 23
| Minnesota
| W 78–75
| Tied (16)
| Billings (13)
| Laney (10)
| IMG Academy
| 3–11
|- style="background:#fcc;"
| 15
| August 28
| Minnesota
| L 79–88
| Laney (22)
| C. Williams (10)
| Tied (5)
| IMG Academy
| 3–12
|- style="background:#fcc;"
| 16
| August 30
| Los Angeles
| L 79–84
| Carter (26)
| Billings (14)
| Dietrick (5)
| IMG Academy
| 3–13

|- style="background:#bbffbb;"
| 17
| September 1
| Indiana
| W 102–90
| Tied (22)
| Johnson (8)
| Carter (6)
| IMG Academy
| 4–13
|- style="background:#bbffbb;"
| 18
| September 3
| New York
| W 62–56
| C. Williams (15)
| C. Williams (13)
| Laney (3)
| IMG Academy
| 5–13
|- style="background:#fcc;"
| 19
| September 5
| Las Vegas
| L 79–89
| Laney (21)
| 3 tied (7)
| Carter (6)
| IMG Academy
| 5–14
|- style="background:#bbffbb;"
| 20
| September 9
| Chicago
| W 97–89
| Laney (24)
| 3 tied (10)
| Tied (5)
| IMG Academy
| 6–14
|- style="background:#bbffbb;"
| 21
| September 11
| Connecticut
| W 82–75
| Carter (22)
| Laney (10)
| Tied (4)
| IMG Academy
| 7–14
|- style="background:#fcc;"
| 22
| September 13
| Washington
| L 78–85
| Laney (27)
| C. Williams (11)
| Dietrick (4)
| IMG Academy
| 7–15

Standings

Statistics

Regular Season

Awards and Honors

References

External links
The Official Site of the Atlanta Dream

Atlanta Dream seasons
Atlanta
Atlanta Dream